1,1,1,2,2,3,3-Heptachloropropane is a compound of chlorine, hydrogen, and carbon. Its linear formula is CClCHCl

References

Chloroalkanes